Zhang Sipeng (born 14 May 1987 in Haidian, Beijing) is a Chinese footballer who plays as a goalkeeper.

Club career
In 2007 Zhang Sipeng started his professional footballer career with Beijing Guoan in the Chinese Super League. He immediately became a team regular within his first season at the football squad and has consistently played understudy to Yang Zhi as the first choice goalkeeper. He would eventually make his league debut for Beijing on 13 June 2009 in a game against Tianjin Teda that saw Beijing win 1–0.

On 2 January 2015, Zhang transferred to fellow Chinese Super League side Jiangsu Sainty. On 26 February 2018, Zhang transferred to Guizhou Hengfeng.

Career statistics 
Statistics accurate as of match played 31 December 2020.

Honours

Club
Jiangsu Sainty
Chinese FA Cup: 2015

References

External links
Player profile at Beijing Guoan website
Player stats at football-lineups website
Zhang Sipeng's Blog
 

1987 births
Living people
Chinese footballers
Footballers from Beijing
Beijing Guoan F.C. players
Jiangsu F.C. players
Guizhou F.C. players
China League Two players
China League One players
Chinese Super League players
Association football goalkeepers